In fiction, a canon is material accepted as being authentically produced by an author or an ascribed author.

Canon is often contrasted with, or used as the basis for, works of fan fiction and other derivative works.

Origin
It comes from the Greek meaning "measuring rod" and was introduced by religious discourse: the Biblical canon. The word was used for the biblical books, laws and saints that the Catholic Church considered official, in contrast to the apocryphal ones. Over time the term canonical was used to indicate the sacred texts that believers should read. On the other hand, the books that should not be read were mentioned in the Index Librorum Prohibitorum.

Subsequently, the concept was expressly used in the field of literature to refer to those classic books that students should read in their transit through school or that should appear in textbooks or anthologies of literary works.

Canonicity
When there are multiple "official" works or original media, what material is canonical can be unclear. This is resolved either by explicitly excluding certain media from the status of canon (as in the case of Star Trek and Star Wars), by assigning different levels of canonicity to different media (as was in the case of Star Wars before its ownership by Disney), by considering different but licensed media treatments official and equally canonical to the series timeline within their own continuities' universe, but not across them, or not resolved at all. There is also no consensus regarding who has the authority to decide what is or isn't canon, with copyright holders usually declaring themselves the authorities when they want to erase or retcon materials that were approved by the setting's original creator (with Star Wars again being an example). The use of canon is of particular importance with regard to reboots or re-imaginings of established franchises, such as the Star Trek remake (2009), because of the ways in which it influences the viewer experience.

Examples 
The official Star Trek website describes Star Trek canon as "the events that take place within the episodes and movies" referring to the live-action television series and films, with Star Trek: The Animated Series having long existed in a nebulous gray area of canonicity. Events, characters and storylines from tie-in novels, comic books, and video games are explicitly excluded from the Star Trek canon, but the site notes that elements from these sources have been subsequently introduced into the television series, and says that "canon is not something set in stone." Some non-canonical elements that later became canonical in the Star Trek universe are Uhura's first name Nyota, introduced in the novels and made canonical in the 2009 film Star Trek, and James T. Kirk's middle name Tiberius, introduced in the Star Trek animated series and made canonical in Star Trek VI: The Undiscovered Country.

During George Lucas' time with the franchise, Star Wars canon was divided into discrete tiers that incorporated the Expanded Universe (EU), with continuity tracked by Lucasfilm creative executive Leland Chee. Higher-tier and newer material abrogated lower-tier and older material in case of contradiction. The live-action theatrical films, the 2008 The Clone Wars TV series and its debut film, and statements by Lucas himself were at the top of this hierarchy; such works invariably superseded EU material in case of contradiction. The EU itself was further divided into several descending levels of continuity. After Disney's acquisition of the franchise, Lucasfilm designated all Expanded Universe material published prior to 25 April 2014 (other than the first six theatrical films and the 2008 The Clone Wars film and TV series) as the non-canonical "Legends" continuity. Material released since this announcement is a separate canonical timeline from the original George Lucas Canon, with all narrative development overseen by the Lucasfilm Story Group.

The makers of Doctor Who have generally avoided making pronouncements about canonicity, with Russell T Davies explaining that he does not think about the concept for the Doctor Who television series or its spin-offs.

Additional works

Other writers
The canon status of some works by the original writer but not the same publisher, such as "The Field Bazaar", may be debated. 
This is because copyright used to be exercised by the publisher of the work of literature rather than the author. 
Campaigning by Victor Hugo led to the Berne Convention which introduced author's rights.

However, sometimes in literature, original writers have not approved works as canon, but original publishers or literary estates of original writers posthumously approve subsequent works as canon, such as The Royal Book of Oz (1921) (by original publisher), Porto Bello Gold (1924) (by estate), and Heidi Grows Up (1938) (by estate).

Late 20th century
In film and television this is common that the original writer does not decide canon. In literature, the estate of H. G. Wells authorised sequels by Stephen Baxter, The Massacre of Mankind (2017) and The Time Ships (1995). Scarlett was a 1991 sequel to Gone with the Wind authorised by the estate.

21st century
In 2010, the Conan Doyle estate authorised Young Sherlock Holmes and The House of Silk.
Sequels to the stories by P G Wodehouse about the butler Jeeves were sanctioned by Wodehouse's estate for Jeeves and the Wedding Bells (2013) by Sebastian Faulks and Jeeves and the King of Clubs (2018) by Ben Schott. The Monogram Murders (2014) by Sophie Hannah is a sequel to Hercule Poirot novels authorised by the Agatha Christie estate.

Fanon

Fan fiction is almost never regarded as canonical. However, certain ideas may become influential or widely accepted within fan communities, who refer to such ideas as "fanon", a blend of fan and canon. Similarly, the jargon "headcanon" is used to describe a fan's personal interpretation of a fictional universe.

See also

References

Sources
Rebecca Black, Digital Design: English Language Learners and Reader Reviews in Online Fiction, in A New Literacies Sampler, p. 126

External links

 

1911 introductions